The politics of Saint Helena, Ascension and Tristan da Cunha operate under the jurisdiction of the government of the United Kingdom. The three parts of the territory—Saint Helena, Ascension Island and Tristan da Cunha—effectively form an asymmetric federacy and collectively constitute one of United Kingdom's fourteen overseas territories.

Structure of government

Because of the islands' status as an overseas territory of the United Kingdom, they are currently ruled over by Charles III and his government in the United Kingdom, with the Governor of Saint Helena serving as the monarch's representative to the territory as well as the territory's executive. This position is currently held by Nigel Phillips, who took office in 2022. Island Administrators serve as the representatives of the Governor on Ascension and Tristan da Cunha, which are distant from Saint Helena island, and are permanently resident on those islands. These roles are presently filled by Colin Wells and Sean Burns respectively. The territory's Governor and Attorney General reside at Jamestown on Saint Helena.

Formation and Constitution, 1922–present
In September 1922, Ascension Island became a dependency of Saint Helena, followed by Tristan da Cunha in January 1938. The three islands were held under this flagship as "Saint Helena and Dependencies" until they were collectively changed to equal status in 2009, becoming Saint Helena, Ascension and Tristan da Cunha.

A new constitution, the St Helena, Ascension and Tristan da Cunha Constitution Order 2009, replaced a previous constitution drafted in 1988, providing a Bill of Rights for citizens and details outlining balanced provisions for the islands. It confirmed the allegiance of the three islands to the United Kingdom, its Government and the Crown and that the islands now formed a single, territorial grouping. The constitution also placed restrictions on the governor's power, forming more of a union between the Governor and the two Resident Administrators.

Attorney General of Saint Helena 
The post of the Attorney General of Saint Helena was created around 1978. Beforehand, the "Legal Advisers Office", as it was called at that time, was to provide legal advice to the St. Helena Government and the Judiciary and legal support to the Land Adjudication exercise."

Antony Rushford is identified as having been the Attorney General of Saint Helena. However, his years of service are unknown. Rushford had also served as the Attorney General of Anguilla and Attorney General of Grenada.

Media

Each of the islands offers radio stations and local newspapers. While there are no locally operated TV stations anywhere in the territory, overseas programming is broadcast via satellite in St. Helena. Cable and Wireless Communications, based in the UK, operates its telecommunications infrastructure.

The BBC Atlantic Relay Station transmits radio programs to Ascension Island but television service is limited to the British Forces Broadcasting Service. A radio station operated by the US Air Force, "Volcano Radio", also carries locally produced programming.

On Tristan da Cunha, Atlantic FM carries local broadcasts. BFBS TV is also available. The island's first internet cafe opened in 2006.

Judiciary
The territory has four courts of its own:

Court of Appeal
Supreme Court
Magistrates Court
Juvenile Court

The Judicial Committee of the Privy Council, in London, is the final court of appeal for the territory however, as is the case with all other British overseas territories.

Criminal matters are investigated by the Saint Helena Police Service and prosecuted at court by the Crown Prosecutor. The current Crown Prosecutor is Ben Brown, having been appointed on 9 February 2021.

Public Solicitor 
Although there are no private practice lawyers on Saint Helena, there is a Public Solicitor (the office was established on January 2, 1998) that is supported by legally-trained lay advocates. They provide legal advice and assistance to residents, as well as offer court representation whenever appropriate. Depending on the severity of the case, a lawyer from the United Kingdom might be sent for to represent a defendant.

Notes

 
Saint Helena, Ascension and Tristan da Cunha
Politics of Saint Helena